Lawrence Brandon McReynolds (born May 21, 1991) is an American professional stock car racing driver and the spotter for Ross Chastain and the No. 1 Trackhouse Racing Team in the NASCAR Cup Series. As a driver, he has competed in the NASCAR Xfinity Series for JGL Racing, and has also competed in the K&N Pro Series East and West as well as the ARCA Menards Series. He is the son of NASCAR on Fox analyst and former crew chief Larry McReynolds.

Racing career

UARA-STARS Series
The one notable event from McReynolds' UARA-Stars tenure was the 2009 Bailey's 300 at Martinsville Speedway.  Jake Crum won the race, with McReynolds finishing second.  McReynolds and Crum disagreed on tactics used throughout the race which culminated in both getting in to each other on the backstretch after the race. McReynolds captured eight victories during his time on the tour, which was from 2008 to 2010.

K&N Pro Series
McReynolds made a combined total of 44 starts, 29 in the West, 15 in the East from 2011 to 2015.  He scored a best finish of third twice in the East, and won two races in the West series in 2015.  Both wins came from the pole at Iowa.   

In November 2017 it was announced that McReynolds will run a partial K&N Pro Series East schedule in 2018 with longtime NASCAR Modified owner John Visconti in an alliance with Tommy Baldwin Racing, whom McReynolds had previously run with. The team will race whenever McReynolds is not helping with Noah Gragson's team in the Camping World Truck Series. McReynolds captured his first K&N Pro Series East win at New Hampshire in September, beating Derek Kraus and Riley Herbst on a late restart.

ARCA Racing Series
McReynolds logged seven starts from 2010 to 2012, emerging victorious once, at Talladega Superspeedway in 2012, passing Matt Lofton on the final circuit. He returned to the series in 2019 for a partial superspeedway slate with KBR Development.

Camping World Truck Series
In his one start in the series, McReynolds finished 18th at Texas Motor Speedway in 2012.

Xfinity Series
McReynolds made his Xfinity (then Nationwide) debut in 2010, finishing 19th in Eddie Smith's Dodge.  It would be another six years before his next start, a 23rd at Talladega for JGL Racing. His dad Larry was in the booth for FOX broadcasting the race. Later in 2016, McReynolds returned to the JGL No. 24 machine, crashing in the U.S. Cellular 250. McReynolds did not return to NASCAR competition in 2017.

Pinty's Series
In his one start in the series, McReynolds finished 9th at Riverside International Speedway in 2018.

Spotting
In 2017, McReynolds took on the role of spotter and driver coach to Noah Gragson's Kyle Busch Motorsports team in the Camping World Truck Series. After he was unable to find a ride in any NASCAR series in 2020, McReynolds returned to spotting in 2021, replacing Tony Raines (another former driver-turned spotter) as the spotter of the No. 1  Trackhouse Racing Chevy in the NASCAR Cup Series, which will be driven by Ross Chastain.

McReynolds has dipped his toe in to broadcasting like his father, serving as a guest analyst for a K&N Pro Series West race on NBCSN in 2017.

Personal life
He is an avid deer hunter.

Motorsports career results

NASCAR
(key) (Bold – Pole position awarded by qualifying time. Italics – Pole position earned by points standings or practice time. * – Most laps led.)

Xfinity Series

Camping World Truck Series

K&N Pro Series East

K&N Pro Series West

Pinty's Series

 Season still in progress
 Ineligible for series points

ARCA Menards Series
(key) (Bold – Pole position awarded by qualifying time. Italics – Pole position earned by points standings or practice time. * – Most laps led.)

References

External links
 

1991 births
Living people
People from Mooresville, North Carolina
Racing drivers from North Carolina
NASCAR drivers
ARCA Menards Series drivers